The Roman Catholic Archdiocese of Owando is a jurisdiction of the Catholic Church in the Republic of Congo. On February 11, 2011, Pope Benedict XVI appointed Bishop Victor Abagna Mossa as Bishop of Owando.

On May 30, 2020, the Diocese of Owando was raised to Archdiocese, and Bishop Victor Abagna Mossa was elevated to Archbishop.

History
 December 21, 1950: Established as Apostolic Vicariate of Fort-Rousset
 September 14, 1955: Promoted as Diocese of Fort-Rousset
 December 3, 1977: Renamed as Diocese of Owando
 May 30, 2020: Elevated to Archdiocese of Owando

Bishops

Vicars Apostolic of Fort-Rousset
 Emile-Elie Verhille, C.S.Sp. (1951–1955), title changed to Bishop of Fort-Rousset

Bishops of Fort-Rousset
 Emile-Elie Verhille, C.S.Sp. (1955–1968)
 Georges Benoit Gassongo (Apostolic Administrator 1968-1970)

Bishops of Owando
 Georges-Firmin Singha (1972–1988), appointed Bishop of Pointe-Noire
 Ernest Kombo, S.J. (1990–2008)
 Louis Portella Mbuyu (Apostolic Administrator 2008-2011)
 Victor Abagna Mossa (2011-2020), elevated to Archbishop

Archbishops of Owando 
 Victor Abagna Mossa (2020-present)

Former Auxiliary Bishops
 Georges Benoit Gassongo (1965-1981)

Suffragan Dioceses
 Impfondo
 Ouesso

See also
Roman Catholicism in the Republic of the Congo

Sources
 GCatholic - Metropolitan Archdiocese of Owando
 Catholic Hierarchy - Archdiocese of Owando
 Roman Catholic Archdiocese of Owando Official Site

Roman Catholic dioceses in the Republic of the Congo
Christian organizations established in 1950
Roman Catholic dioceses and prelatures established in the 20th century
1950 establishments in French Equatorial Africa
A